Thando Manana  (born 16 October 1977) is a South African former rugby union player.

Playing career
As a schoolboy Manana represented the  academy team at the 1996 Craven Week tournament. At the end of the 2000 season he toured with the Springboks to Argentina, Britain and Ireland. Manana did not play in any test matches but played in three tour matches for the Springboks.

See also
List of South Africa national rugby union players – Springbok no.  708

References

1977 births
Living people
South African rugby union players
South Africa international rugby union players
Griquas (rugby union) players
Rugby union players from Port Elizabeth